The Logan family is a fictional family in the CBS Daytime soap opera The Bold and the Beautiful. The family debuted in the soap opera's first episode, and were a central family in the show's early years, but by the early 1990s, most of the family had departed. Between 1991 and 2006, the family was solely represented by Brooke Logan and her children, with her other family members making occasional guest appearances, usually at one of Brooke's weddings. Between 2006 and 2008, Brooke's parents, Stephen Logan and Elizabeth Logan, Brooke's sisters, Donna Logan and Katie Logan, and Brooke's brother Storm Logan, were all recast and reintroduced. The family is currently represented by Brooke, her daughter Hope Logan, Hope's daughter Beth Spencer, Brooke's sisters, Donna and Katie, Katie's son Will Spencer, and Storm's daughter Flo Fulton.  This is a list of all known members of the Logan family, both past and present, deceased and living.

Family members

First generation

Stephen Logan Sr. (Patrick Duffy)Son of Mr. Logan (deceased) and Helen Logan (deceased). Patriarch of the Logan family. Ex-husband to Beth Henderson. Father to Stephen "Storm" Logan, Brooke Logan, Donna Logan and Katie Logan. Has a rivalry with Stephanie Forrester due to the way that she has treated his daughters, Brooke and Donna. He dated Stephanie's sister Pam Douglas, and tried to convince her to shoot Stephanie, but it was Stephanie who shot him. He passed a period in jail, but later was set free, thanks to Bill Spencer Jr.

Second generation

Stephen "Storm" Logan Jr. (William deVry)Eldest child and only son of Stephen Logan and Beth Henderson, born on December 13, 1964. Was very protective of his younger sisters and had to act as a father figure since their father Stephen was not there very often. Storm was a lawyer and has defended many people on the show. He was engaged to Taylor Hamilton. He shot Stephanie Douglas after the way she had treated Brooke and Donna, and tried to frame his father Stephen for the crime. This showed that Storm still had unresolved issues with his father. He then accidentally shot his sister Katie Logan, and when she needed a heart transplant as a result, he took his own life to give his sister his heart. In 2019, it is revealed that he has a daughter named Florence Fulton.
Brooke Logan Forrester  (Katherine Kelly Lang)Eldest daughter of Stephen and Beth Henderson, born on June 28, 1966. She has been married to Eric Forrester (twice), Ridge Forrester (eight times), Grant Chambers, Thorne Forrester, Whipple Jones, Nick Marone and Bill Spencer, Jr. She is the mother of Rick Forrester, Bridget Forrester, Hope Logan Spencer, R.J. Forrester. and Jack Hamilton Marone. She works at Forrester Creations. She had a longtime rivalry with the late Stephanie Douglas and Taylor Hamilton Hayes. A former CEO of Forrester Creations due to blackmailing the Forrester family who tried to steal her invention, she was a part of Forrester Originals when it started.
Donna Logan (Jennifer Gareis)Daughter of Stephen and Beth Henderson, born in 1969. She had an affair with her sister Katie's fiancé Rocco Carner in 1989. In 2006 she began a relationship with Ridge Forrester Sr. She was engaged to Thorne Forrester, but the wedding was cancelled when it was revealed Donna was using Thorne to get back at Stephanie Forrester. She is the mother of Marcus Forrester, her son with Justin Barber that was adopted by Eric Forrester during Donna's marriage to Eric.
Katie Logan (Heather Tom)Youngest child of Stephen and Beth Henderson, born in 1970. Early in life she was perceived as the "ugly duckling" of the Logan family. She had a platonic relationship with Thorne Forrester. She was shot by her brother, Storm, and needed a heart transplant. Storm committed suicide to give Katie his heart. Her body was rejecting the transplanted heart, but her niece/physician Bridget found a cure, and Katie's life was saved. She is the mother of Will Spencer.

Third generation
Eric "Rick" Forrester Jr. (Jacob Young)Son of Brooke and Eric Forrester. As a child he shot Grant Chambers, but repressed the memory. In his late teens to early 20s, he was married to Amber Moore twice. He spent time in Paris, working at Forrester International. After Nick Marone blackmailed Eric into selling him the company, Rick returned from Paris and developed an antagonistic relationship with step-father Ridge Forrester, ostensibly due to Ridge's treatment of Brooke.  Rick has romanced Ridge's daughters Phoebe and Steffy, and was briefly engaged to their mother Dr. Taylor Hayes. He was married to Caroline Spencer and Maya Avant. He is the father of Lizzy Forrester.
Bridget Forrester (Ashley Jones)Daughter of Brooke and Eric Forrester. She worked as a physician at University Hospital, and as a head designer at Jackie M. She has been married to both Deacon Sharpe and Nick Marone, both of whom cheated on her with her mother. She is the mother of Nicole Marone and Logan Knight. She is now living in New York.
Marcus Barber Forrester (Texas Battle)Son of Donna and Justin Barber. He was given up for adoption at birth, and adopted by the Waltons. He arrived in Los Angeles as a teenager after hearing about his mother's wedding in the newspaper. He had a relationship with Steffy Forrester, who refused his marriage proposal. In October 2009, he was adopted by Eric Forrester (who was married to Donna at the time) and in February 2011, he was also adopted by his biological father. He is the father of Ambrosia "Rosie" Barber Forrester.
Hope Logan (Annika Noelle)Daughter of Brooke and Deacon Sharpe, born onscreen in 2002. Her paternity was hidden because Deacon was married to Brooke's daughter Bridget at the time. Her name is on the HFTF (Hope for The Future) fashion line owned by the Forresters. She has been involved in love triangles with Liam Spencer, Wyatt Spencer and Steffy Forrester respectively. She's the mother of Beth Spencer.

Florence Fulton (Katrina Bowden)  Daughter of Storm and Shauna Fulton. Flo never knew Storm was her father until after he died, and was raised by her mother.

Ridge "R.J." Forrester Jr. (Anthony Turpel)Brooke's son with Ridge Forrester, born onscreen in June 2004. Prior to his birth, he was thought to be the son of Nick Marone but a paternity test proved he was Ridge's son.

Jack Hamilton MaroneBiological son of Brooke and Nick Marone, but he was carried by Taylor Hamilton. Wanting Nick back after he got engaged to Taylor, Brooke attempted to give Nick a child before Taylor could and went to the hospital to have her eggs checked for viability. Her eggs were mistakenly transplanted into Taylor. Both Taylor and Brooke agreed to take care of Jack. He was named after Jackie Marone, Nick's mother, and Jack Hamilton, Taylor's father.

William "Will" Logan SpencerSon of Katie and Bill Spencer Jr., born on September 25, 2012.

Fourth generation
Eric Forrester IIISon of Rick and Amber Moore, stillborn in 1999.
Nicole MaroneDaughter of Bridget and Nick Marone, stillborn in 2006.
Logan Forrester KnightSon of Bridget and Owen Knight, born on air September 3, 2010. He came out of a one-night stand between Bridget and Owen. At the time, Bridget was married to Nick Marone and Owen to Jacqueline Marone.
Ambrosia "Rosie" Barber ForresterDaughter of Marcus and Amber Moore, born on air on June 20, 2011. Rosie was initially thought to be the daughter of Liam Spencer or Oliver Jones.
Elizabeth Nicole "Lizzy" ForresterDaughter of Rick and Nicole Avant, and legally adopted by Maya Avant.
Douglas ForresterHope's adoptive son with Thomas Forrester. He's Thomas' son with Caroline Spencer. Caroline died, and Hope later married Thomas. After they separated, Hope still went through with the adoption.
Elizabeth Avalon “Beth” SpencerDaughter of Hope and Liam Spencer. She was stolen by Reese Buckingham, Hope's doctor, while Hope and Liam believed Beth had died. She was adopted by Steffy Forrester, who called her Phoebe, after her twin sister. Liam discovered the truth, and Beth was returned to her parents.

In-laws
Beth Henderson - Stephen's wife (deceased), mother of Storm, Brooke, Donna and Katie
 Eric Forrester Sr. - Brooke's husband (1991–93, 2005–06) and Donna's husband (2008–10), father of Rick and Bridget, adoptive father of Marcus
 Ridge Forrester Sr.  - Brooke's husband (1994–95, 1998, 2003–04, 2004–05, 2009, 2009–11, 2012, 2018–22), R.J.'s father 
 Grant Chambers - Brooke's husband (1997). 
Whipple "Whip" Jones III - Brooke's husband (2002)
Justin Barber - Donna's husband (2011), Marcus' father
William "Bill" Spencer Jr. - Katie's husband (2009–14, 2015–16) and Brooke's husband (2017–18), Will's father
Ambrosia "Amber" Moore - Rick's wife (1999–2000, 2001–03), mother of Eric III and Rosie
Caroline Spencer - Rick's wife (2013–15)
Maya Avant - Rick's wife (2015–18), adoptive mother of Izzy
Deacon Sharpe - Bridget's husband (2001–02), Hope's father 
Dominick "Nick" Marone - Bridget's husband (2005–06, 2008, 2009–10) and Brooke's husband (2006–07), father of Nicole and Jack 
William "Liam" Spencer III - Hope's husband (2012, 2018–19, 2020–), father of Beth 
Wyatt Spencer - Hope's husband (2014–15)
Dayzee Leigh - Marcus' wife (2012–)
Thorne Forrester - Brooke's husband (2001) and Katie's husband (2018–19)
Thomas Forrester - Hope's husband (2019); father of Douglas

Logan family tree

Descendants

Unnamed man (deceased); married Helen Logan (deceased)
Stephen Logan (1938–); Mr. Logan and Helen's son; married Beth Henderson  (deceased)
Storm Logan (1960–2008); Stephen and Beth's son
Florence Logan (1987–); Storm's daughter with Shauna Fulton
Brooke Logan (1961–); Stephen and Beth's daughter; married Eric Forrester (1991–93, 2005–06), Ridge Forrester (1994–95, 1998, 2003–04, 2004–05, 2009, 2009–11, 2012, 2018–22), Grant Chambers (1997), Thorne Forrester (2001), Whip Jones (2002), Nick Marone (2006–07), Bill Spencer Jr. (2017–18)
Rick Forrester (1981–); Brooke and Eric's son; married Amber Moore (1999–2000, 2001–03), Caroline Spencer (2013–15), Maya Avant (2015–18)
Eric Forrester III (1999); Rick and Amber's son (stillborn)
Lizzy Forrester (2016–); Rick's daughter with Nicole Avant, legally adopted by Maya
Bridget Forrester (1983–); Brooke and Eric's daughter; married Deacon Sharpe (2001–02), Nick Marone (2005–06, 2008, 2009–10)
Nicole Marone (2006); Bridget and Nick's daughter
Logan Forrester Knight (2010–); Bridget's son with Owen Knight
Hope Logan (1992–); Brooke's daughter with Deacon Sharpe; married Liam Spencer (2012, 2018–19, 2020–), Wyatt Spencer (2014–15), Thomas Forrester (2019)
Beth Spencer (2019–); Hope and Liam's daughter
Douglas Forrester (2016–); Hope's adoptive son with Thomas
RJ Forrester (2000–); Brooke and Ridge's son
Jack Hamilton Marone (2007–); Brooke and Nick's son, carried by Dr. Taylor Hayes
Donna Logan (1969–); Stephen and Beth's daughter; married Eric Forrester (2008–10), Justin Barber (2011)
Marcus Forrester (1987–); Donna and Justin's son, adopted by Eric; married Dayzee Leigh (2012–)
Rosie Forrester (2012–); Marcus' daughter with Amber Moore
Katie Logan (1972–); Stephen and Beth's daughter; married Bill Spencer Jr. (2009–14, 2015–16), Thorne Forrester (2018–19)
Will Spencer (2012–); Katie and Bill's son

References

The Bold and the Beautiful families
Television characters introduced in 1987
The Bold and the Beautiful characters